The men's hammer throw event at the 2000 World Junior Championships in Athletics was held in Santiago, Chile, at Estadio Nacional Julio Martínez Prádanos on 18 October.  A 7257g (senior implement) hammer was used.

Medalists

Results

Final
18 October

Participation
According to an unofficial count, 14 athletes from 12 countries participated in the event.

References

Hammer throw
Hammer throw at the World Athletics U20 Championships